Alexandra Alexandrovna Proklova (born 5 April 2000) is a Russian retired figure skater. She is the 2013 JGP Czech Republic champion and the 2014 Russian junior national bronze medalist.

Personal life 
Alexandra ("Sasha" or "Shura") Alexandrovna Proklova was born on 5 April 2000 in Moscow. Her father is a former rugby player.

Apart from figure skating, Proklova also enjoys dancing and ballet.

Career 
Proklova picked figure skating, which she and her mother enjoyed watching on television, after her parents decided to enroll her in a sport to redirect her energy. She began learning at age four at CSKA Moscow, taught by Oksana Liashnevskaya. After her coach moved to another rink, to which the commute was long, Proklova decided to switch to Inna Goncharenko, in 2009.

In the 2013–14 season, Proklova debuted on the Junior Grand Prix series. In her first JGP event in Košice, Slovakia, she won the silver medal with a total score 3.97 points less than gold medalist Karen Chen. Proklova then won gold in her next assignment in Ostrava, Czech Republic, finishing 15.59 points ahead of silver medalist and teammate Maria Sotskova. Proklova finished fifth at the Junior Grand Prix Final in Fukuoka, Japan. At the Russian Championships, she placed fourth in her senior debut and then won the bronze medal on the junior level. During the off-season, Proklova sustained a fracture in her leg in an on-ice fall.

Programs

Competitive highlights 
JGP: Junior Grand Prix

References

External links 
 

2000 births
Russian female single skaters
Living people
Figure skaters from Moscow